Batocera rubus is a species of beetle in the family Cerambycidae. It was described by Carl Linnaeus in his landmark 1758 10th edition of Systema Naturae. It is known from Japan, China, Java, India, Laos, Myanmar, Malaysia, the Philippines, South Korea, Taiwan, Sumatra, Thailand, and Vietnam. It feeds on Ficus carica, Ficus elastica, and Mangifera indica.

Subspecies

 Batocera rubus mniszechi Thomson, 1859
 Batocera rubus palawanica Kaup, 1866
 Batocera rubus rubus (Linnaeus, 1758)

References

Batocerini
Beetles described in 1758
Taxa named by Carl Linnaeus
Beetles of Asia